Goodling is a surname. Notable people with the surname include:

George Atlee Goodling (1896–1982), Republican member of the U.S. House of Representatives from Pennsylvania
Monica Goodling (born 1973), former US government lawyer and political appointee in the George W. Bush administration
William F. Goodling (1927–2017), Republican member of the U.S. House of Representatives from Pennsylvania

See also
William F. Goodling Child Nutrition Reauthorization Act of 1998 (P.L. 105–336) extended expiring authorizations for child nutrition and commodity assistance programs, and the WIC program, through FY2003